A Breed Apart is a 1984 American drama film directed by Philippe Mora. It stars Kathleen Turner, Rutger Hauer and Powers Boothe.

The screenplay by Paul Wheeler concerns the need to protect endangered species, in this case the bald eagle.

Plot
Obsessive bird egg collector J.P. Whittier is determined to obtain the eggs of a newly discovered species of bald eagle nesting high up on the private island of reclusive Vietnam veteran Jim Malden.  Whittier hires mountaineer Mike Walker to pose as a photographer and win Malden's confidence in order to gain access to the eggs.  Subplots include locals seeking revenge on Malden after being caught hunting on his island without permission and Malden's inability to express his affection for local store owner Stella Clayton and her son Adam.  At Walker's suggestion, Malden visits Stella to tell her how he truly feels.  Walker uses the opportunity to scale the mountain where the eggs lie, only to fall victim to his conscience when his goal is within his grasp.  Malden, Stella & Adam are united at the end, while Walker provides a local reporter with a scoop about Whittier's illegal hobby.

Cast
 Rutger Hauer as Jim Malden 
 Powers Boothe as Mike Walker 
 Kathleen Turner as Stella Clayton 
 Donald Pleasence as J.P. Whittier
 Andy Fenwick as Adam Clayton
 Brion James as Peyton

Production
At the time the film was made, the bald eagle was on the brink of extirpation in the continental United States. The bird now has a stable population and was removed from the federal government's list of endangered species in June 2007.

The film was shot on location in Asheville,  Biltmore Estate,  Chimney Rock State Park, and Lake Lure in North Carolina. After principal filming had finished, the film reels were sent back by plane to Los Angeles. One reel (of 4) never arrived, so the film was substantially reorganized around the missing scenes (shot out of order) in editing. This partly explains why some sub-plots are incomplete and Malden has no back story.

Principal production credits
Producers ..... John Daly, Derek Gibson
Original Music ..... Maurice Gibb    
Cinematography ..... Geoffrey Stephenson
Production Design ..... William Barclay    
Art Direction ..... Jeff Ginn    
Set Decoration ..... Ed Sears    
Costume Design ..... John Boxer
Film Editor ..... Chris Lebenzon

Critical reception
Variety said the film "lacks reason, dramatic tension or emotional involvement."

References

External links
 
 

1984 films
1984 drama films
American drama films
Films shot in North Carolina
1980s English-language films
Orion Pictures films
Films directed by Philippe Mora
1980s American films